Ropes is a surname, likely of a trade-related origin. People with the surname include:

Adrian Ropes (1941–2004), Egyptian-born English television actor
Arthur Reed Ropes, real name of Adrian Ross (1859–1933), British songwriter
Bradford Ropes (1905–1966), American novelist and screenwriter
David Ropes (died 1781), privateer from Salem, Massachusetts
George Ropes (1788–1819), American artist
James Hardy Ropes (1866–1933), American theologian
John Codman Ropes (1836–1899), American military historian and lawyer, co-founder of the law firm Ropes & Gray
Nathaniel Ropes, merchant and namesake of the Nathaniel Ropes Building in Cincinnati, Ohio
Sharon Erickson Ropes (born 1954), Minnesota politician
Wayne M. Ropes (1898–1948), American politician and businessman

References

Occupational surnames
English-language occupational surnames